Velev (masculine) or Veleva (feminine) is a Bulgarian surname. Notable people with the surname include:

Anna Veleva, Bulgarian opera singer
Emil Velev (born 1962), Bulgarian footballer and manager
Milen Velev (born 1971), Bulgarian tennis player
Milenko Velev, Bulgarian architect
Stefan Velev (born 1989), Bulgarian footballer
Vasil Velev (born 1984), Bulgarian footballer
Vyacheslav Velyev (born 2000), Ukrainian footballer of Bulgarian descent

Bulgarian-language surnames